The 2022 Texas lieutenant gubernatorial election was held on November 8, 2022, to elect the lieutenant governor of the state of Texas. The election coincided with various other federal and state elections, including for governor of Texas. Primary elections were held on March 1, with runoffs being held on May 24 for instances in which no candidate received a majority of the initial vote. Texas is one of 21 states that elects its lieutenant governor separately from its governor.

Incumbent Republican lieutenant governor Dan Patrick won re-election to a third term, defeating Democratic nominee Mike Collier in a rematch of the 2018 election.

Republican primary

Candidates

Nominee

Dan Patrick, incumbent lieutenant governor

Eliminated in primary
Trayce Bradford, activist
Todd Bullis, businessman and anti-abortion activist
Daniel Miller, president of the Texas Nationalist Movement
Aaron Sorrells, businessman
Zach Vance, retired military

Endorsements

Polling

Results

Democratic primary

Candidates

Nominee
Mike Collier, finance chair of the Texas Democratic Party and nominee for comptroller in 2014 and lieutenant governor in 2018

Eliminated in runoff
Michelle Beckley, state representative from the 65th district

Eliminated in primary
Carla Brailey, vice chair of the Texas Democratic Party

Withdrawn
Matthew Dowd, political consultant, ABC News contributor, and former staffer to U.S. Senator Lloyd Bentsen

Endorsements

First round

Polling
Graphical summary

Results

Runoff

Polling

Results

Libertarian convention

Nominee 
Shanna Steele, college student and former federal employee

General election

Endorsements

Polling 
Graphical summary

Dan Patrick vs. Michelle Beckley

Results

See also
2022 Texas elections

Notes

Partisan clients

References

External links
Official campaign websites
 Mike Collier (D) for Lieutenant Governor
 Dan Patrick (R) for Lieutenant Governor

Lieutenant Gubernatorial
Texas